30705 Idaios  is a Jupiter trojan from the Trojan camp, approximately  in diameter. It was discovered during the third Palomar–Leiden Trojan survey at the Palomar Observatory in California in 1977. The dark D-type asteroid has a rotation period of 15.7 hours. It was named after the Trojan herald Idaios from Greek mythology.

Discovery 

Idaios was discovered on 16 October 1977, by Dutch astronomer couple Ingrid and Cornelis van Houten at Leiden, on photographic plates taken by Dutch–American astronomer Tom Gehrels at the Palomar Observatory in California. The body's observation arc begins with a precovery published by the Digitized Sky Survey and taken at Palomar in February 1955, more than 22 years prior to its official discovery observation.

Palomar–Leiden survey 

The survey designation "T-3" stands for the third Palomar–Leiden Trojan survey, named after the fruitful collaboration of the Palomar and Leiden Observatory in the 1960s and 1970s. Gehrels used Palomar's Samuel Oschin telescope (also known as the 48-inch Schmidt Telescope), and shipped the photographic plates to Ingrid and Cornelis van Houten at Leiden Observatory where astrometry was carried out. The trio are credited with the discovery of several thousand asteroids.

Orbit and classification 

Idaios is a dark Jovian asteroid in a 1:1 orbital resonance with Jupiter. It is located in the trailering Trojan camp at the Gas Giant's  Lagrangian point, 60° behind its orbit . It is also a non-family asteroid of the Jovian background population. It orbits the Sun at a distance of 4.9–5.5 AU once every 11 years and 10 months (4,335 days; semi-major axis of 5.2 AU). Its orbit has an eccentricity of 0.06 and an inclination of 20° with respect to the ecliptic.

Naming 

This minor planet was named from Greek mythology after king Priam's herald Idaios, who tells him that Paris and Menelaus want to start a duel. Idaios is the younger son of Dares a priest of the god Hephaestus, who helped Idaios to escaped Diomedes as he did not want his priest to lose both his sons. The official naming citation was published by the Minor Planet Center on 18 March 2003.

Physical characteristics 

In the SDSS-based taxonomy, Idaios is a dark D-type asteroid, the most common type among the Jupiter trojans.

Rotation period 

In September 2013, a first rotational lightcurve of Idaios was obtained from photometric observations in the R-band by astronomers at the Palomar Transient Factory in California. Lightcurve analysis gave a rotation period of 15.733 hours with a brightness amplitude of 0.22 magnitude.

Between 2013 and 2017, three additional period determinations were made by Robert Stephens at the Center for Solar System Studies, with the best-rated lightcurve from 2014 showing a more refined period  hours and an amplitude of 0.22 magnitude.

Diameter and albedo 

According to the survey carried out by the NEOWISE mission of NASA's Wide-field Infrared Survey Explorer, Idaios measures 44.546 kilometers in diameter and its surface has an albedo of 0.074.

The Collaborative Asteroid Lightcurve Link assumes a standard albedo for a carbonaceous asteroid of 0.057 and a diameter of 46.30 kilometers based on an absolute magnitude of 10.4.

Notes

References

External links 
 Asteroid Lightcurve Database (LCDB), query form (info )
 Dictionary of Minor Planet Names, Google books
 Discovery Circumstances: Numbered Minor Planets (30001)-(35000) – Minor Planet Center
 
 

030705
Discoveries by Cornelis Johannes van Houten
Discoveries by Ingrid van Houten-Groeneveld
Discoveries by Tom Gehrels
3365
Named minor planets
19771016